Dotoramades is a genus of beetles in the family Cerambycidae, containing the following species:

 Dotoramades basalis Villiers, 1982
 Dotoramades difformipes Bates, 1879
 Dotoramades masoalensis Villiers, 1982
 Dotoramades sambiranensis Villiers, 1982
 Dotoramades suturalis Villiers, 1982

References

Dorcasominae